Santa Quitéria may refer to:

Places
Santa Quitéria, Ceará, a municipality in Brazil
Santa Quitéria do Maranhão, a municipality in Maranhão, Brazil
Santa Quitéria River, Brazil
Santa Quiteria Bridge, in the Province of Castellón, Spain
Santa Quitéria, Funchal

Other
Saint Quiteria, 5th-century virgin martyr
Santa Quitéria Futebol Clube, Brazil